The National Human Rights Commission of Mongolia (ХЭҮК) was established under the Law on the National Human Rights Commission of Mongolia 2000 (the Act) and commenced operations on 1 February 2001.

Mandate and functions 
 Review and process complaints on violations of human rights and freedoms
 Advise, with recommendations and proposals, on compliance of national legislative acts and administrative decisions with key human rights principles
 Make suggestions for effective implementation of international human rights covenants and assist the Government in preparing its treaty reports
 Increase public awareness on laws and international treaties related to human rights
 Promote human rights education
 Encourage agreement to and ratification of international human rights treaties.

The Commission’s main activities include investigations, complaints handling and research.  The Commission’s complaints mechanism is available to those complaining of violations of human rights by a public authority or a business.  Eligible Complainants must be:

Citizens of Mongolia, either individually or in a group; or
Foreign citizens and/or stateless persons who are residing in the territory of Mongolia (unless otherwise provided in laws and international treaties of Mongolia); or
Lawful representatives-parents, care-takers and/or guardians for the persons who do not have full civil law capacity or have some limited or partial capacity; or
Representatives provided under the law for persons who are considered missing or declared as deceased; or
Non-governmental organizations and Labour Unions can lodge their complaints through their representatives
The Commission will reply within 30 days of receipt of a complaint, or 60 days where the Chief Commissioner grants an extension for further investigation and enquiry.

Complaints that will not be accepted:

Criminal and civil cases and/ or disputes, which are at the stage of registration/ inquiry, investigation and/or on trial or have been already decided
Complaint regarding personal relationship of individuals
Complaint regarding issues that can be directly decided by relevant official.

Commissioners and Secretariat
The Commission consists of three commissioners: Chairperson, two standing commissioners.
 Mr. Byambadorj Jamsran, Chief Commissioner
 Mr. Ganbayar Nanzad, Commissioner
 Ms. Oyunchimeg Purev, Commissioner

Under to the Law on the National Human Rights Commission of Mongolia, the Commission has a Secretariat. The Secretariat of the Commission was established on 20 February 2001. The rules and regulations of the Secretariat are adopted by the Chief Commissioner, and the staff and salary fund are included in the budget approved by the State Great Hural.

Members of the Secretariat are civil administrative workers. The Secretariat primarily aims at providing the Commission with stable and steady activity, supporting the Chief Commissioner and the Commissioners in fulfilling their authority with methodological assistance.

External links
 National Human Rights Commission Official Website

References

Human rights in Mongolia
National human rights institutions
2000 establishments in Mongolia